JK Kaitseliit Kalev was an Estonian football club based in Tallinn.

References

Kaitseliit Kalev
Kaitseliit Kalev